Grygla Municipal Airport - Mel Wilkens Field  is city-owned public-use airport located one mile southwest of the central business district of Grygla, a city in Marshall County, Minnesota.

History 
Planning for the airport began in 1991. The airport was officially opened on August 25, 2002. The airport was dedicated to Mel Wilkens, a local pilot and resident of Grygla.

The local Lions Clubs chapter hosts a fly-in every year on the last Sunday before Labor Day.

Facilities and aircraft 
Grygla Municipal Airport covers an area of 78 acres which contains one runway designated 17/35 with a  turf surface. For the 12-month period ending May 31, 2017, the airport had 400 general aviation aircraft operations.

References

External links 
 

Airports in Minnesota
Buildings and structures in Marshall County, Minnesota
Transportation in Marshall County, Minnesota